Dylan Hunter (born May 21, 1985) is a Canadian former ice hockey player, who is a former captain of the London Knights of the OHL and is now currently an assistant coach for the London Knights.

He was drafted 273rd overall in the 2004 NHL Entry Draft by the Buffalo Sabres, in the 9th round. He is the son of Dale Hunter.

Early life
Dylan is one of the three children born to Dale Hunter and his wife Karynka.  He was born in Quebec City when his dad was a member of the Quebec Nordiques but grew up in the Washington, D.C. area when his dad was traded to the Washington Capitals.

Playing career
Member of Team Ontario in the World Under-17 Championships in Selkirk, Manitoba.
Member of the Canada/Russia Challenge Series in November 2004.
Member of the Memorial Cup Champion London Knights (2005).
Became Knights franchise leader in games played on December 2, 2005 (275).
Captain of the London Knights (2005/2006 season).
With Rob Schremp and David Bolland, Hunter was one-third of one of the most productive lines in the Canadian Hockey League during the 2005/2006 season.
Named American Hockey League Player of the Week for the week ending November 5, 2007.

Awards
2003–04 OHL Western Conference Third Team All-Star.
2004–05 OHL Western Conference All-Star.
2005–06 OHL Western Conference All-Star.

Career statistics

References

External links
 

1985 births
Buffalo Sabres draft picks
Canadian ice hockey centres
Canadian emigrants to the United States
Cincinnati Cyclones (ECHL) players
Utah Grizzlies (ECHL) players
Houston Aeros (1994–2013) players
Ice hockey people from Quebec City
Living people
London Knights players
Milwaukee Admirals players
Ice hockey people from Washington, D.C.
Portland Pirates players
Rochester Americans players